The Meadow Lake Tribal Council (MLTC) is a tribal council representing nine First Nation band governments in the province of Saskatchewan. The council is based in Meadow Lake, Saskatchewan.

Services 
MLTC provides and coordinates health care, education, and social services.  It also provides some policing services for member nations. It owns a series of companies which are intended to provide employment for members and economic opportunities for the communities it serves. The First Nation members are scattered around northern Saskatchewan. 

During the COVID-19 pandemic, MLTC received a $387,000 grant from the Public Health Agency of Canada's Immunization Partnership Fund to increase rates of COVID-19 vaccination and decrease vaccine hesitancy among Meadow Lake First Nation communities.

Staff

Members  
 Birch Narrows First Nation see Turnor Lake, Saskatchewan
 Buffalo River Dene Nation see Dillon, Saskatchewan
 Canoe Lake Cree Nation see Canoe Narrows, Saskatchewan
 Clearwater River Dene Nation
 English River Dene Nation see Patuanak, Saskatchewan
 Flying Dust First Nation 
 Island Lake First Nation
 Makwa Sahgaiehcan First Nation 
 Waterhen Lake First Nation

References

External links
 MLTC home page

First Nations governments in Saskatchewan
Meadow Lake, Saskatchewan